The Life and Times of Hank Greenberg is a 1998 documentary film written, directed, and produced by Aviva Kempner about Hank Greenberg, first baseman of the Detroit Tigers, who was inducted into the Baseball Hall of Fame. A Jewish player who chose not to play on Yom Kippur in 1934 during a heated pennant race, Greenberg had to face a great deal of antisemitism. In 1938 he nearly broke Babe Ruth's 60 home run record by hitting 58 home runs.

Like many players of the era, Greenberg had his career interrupted by military service during World War II. Initially, Greenberg was classified as unfit for service due to flat feet. However, upon re-examination, he was cleared. Before Japan's attack on Pearl Harbor, the United States Congress had released men over age 28. After the attack, Greenberg immediately reenlisted in the United States Army Air Forces.

In 1947, Greenberg, as a member of the Pittsburgh Pirates and playing his final season, was one of the few ballplayers to give a warm welcome to Brooklyn Dodgers' Jackie Robinson, the majors' first black player in many years. Robinson later said, "Class tells. It sticks out all over Mr. Greenberg".

Production 
Kempner states that the film took 13 years to make.  "It was all about raising money for the rights to the archival and feature footage. That was so expensive that I had to stop and start about 20 times." After its theatrical run, The Life and Times of Hank Greenberg was acquired by Cinemax for its Reel Life series.

Film credits

Produced by 
Aviva Kempner .... producer
Ari Daniel Pinchot .... associate producer

Directed by 
Aviva Kempner

Written by 
Aviva Kempner

Cast overview 

Reeve Robert Brenner .... Himself – interviewee
Hank Greenberg .... Himself (archive footage)
Walter Matthau .... Himself – interviewee
Alan M. Dershowitz .... Himself – interviewee (as Alan Dershowitz)
Carl Levin .... Himself – interviewee (as Senator Carl Levin)
Stephen Greenberg .... Himself – interviewee
Joseph Greenberg .... Himself – interviewee (as Joe Greenberg)
Rabbi Max Ticktin .... Himself – interviewee
Bill Mead .... Himself – interviewee
Lou Gehrig .... Himself (archive footage)
Basil 'Mickey' Briggs .... Himself – interviewee
Don Shapiro .... Himself – interviewee
Bert Gordon .... Himself – interviewee
Joe Falls .... Himself – interviewee
Henry Ford .... Himself (archive footage)
Fr. Charles Coughlin .... Himself (archive footage)
Dr. George Barahal .... Himself – interviewee
Ira Berkow .... Himself – interviewee
Harold Allen .... Himself – interviewee
Robert Steinberg .... Himself – interviewee
Charlie Gehringer .... Himself – interviewee (also archive footage)
Herman 'Flea' Clifton .... Himself – interviewee
Billy Rogell .... Himself – interviewee
Birdie Tebbetts .... Himself – interviewee (as George 'Birdie' Tebbetts)
Ernie Harwell .... Himself – interviewee
Elden Auker .... Himself – interviewee (as Eldon Auker)
Dick Schaap .... Himself – interviewee
Goose Goslin .... Himself (archive footage)
Dizzy Dean .... Himself (archive footage)
Harvey Frank .... Himself – interviewee
Marilyn Greenberg .... Herself – interviewee
Harriet Colman .... Herself – interviewee
Alva Greenberg .... Herself – interviewee
Mickey Cochrane .... Himself – interviewee
Charlie Grimm .... Himself – interviewee (archive footage)
Michael Moriarty .... Himself – interviewee
Max Lapides .... Himself – interviewee
Gabby Hartnett .... Himself (archive footage)
Joe Louis .... Himself (archive footage)
Shirley Povich .... Himself – interviewee
Al Rosen .... Himself (archive footage)
Rip Collins .... Himself – interviewee
Tommy Bridges .... Himself (archive footage)
Joe DiMaggio .... Himself (archive footage)
Jane Briggs Hart .... Herself – interviewee
Harry Eisenstat .... Himself – interviewee
Bob Feller .... Himself – interviewee (also archive footage)
Hoot Robinson .... Himself – interviewee
Rudy York .... Himself (archive footage)
Hal Newhouser .... Himself – interviewee
Barney McCosky .... Himself – interviewee
Bobo Newsom .... Himself (archive footage) (as 'Buck' Newsom)
Paul Derringer .... Himself (archive footage)
Junior Thompson .... Himself (archive footage)
Bucky Walters .... Himself (archive footage)
Franklin Delano Roosevelt .... Himself (also radio broadcast) (archive footage)
Del Baker .... Himself – interviewee
Arn Tellem .... Himself – interviewee
Barney Ross .... Himself (archive footage)
Caral Gimbel .... Herself – interviewee
Glenn Greenberg .... Himself – interviewee
Sander Levin .... Himself – interviewee (as Congressman Sander Levin)
Walter Briggs, Jr. .... Himself (archive footage) (as Walter 'Spike' Briggs, Jr.)
Walter Briggs, Sr. .... Himself (archive footage)
Happy Chandler .... Himself (archive footage)
Bill Shuster .... Himself (archive footage)
Steve O'Neill .... Himself (archive footage)
Paul Richards .... Himself (archive footage)
Virgil Trucks .... Himself – interviewee
George Kell .... Himself – interviewee
Billy Herman .... Himself (archive footage) (as Billy Hermann)
Jackie Robinson .... Himself (archive footage)
Kenesaw M. Landis .... Himself (archive footage) (uncredited)
Connie Mack .... Himself (archive footage) (uncredited)
Maury Povich .... Himself – interviewee (uncredited)
Babe Ruth .... Himself (archive footage) (uncredited)

Awards 
2001 Broadcast Film Critics Association Awards – "Best Feature Documentary"
2001 Chicago Film Critics Association Awards – "Best Documentary" (tied with The Filth and the Fury (2000))
2001 Columbus International Film & Video Festival – "Silver Chris Award – Religion"
2001 Florida Film Critics Circle Awards – "Best Documentary"
1998 Hamptons International Film Festival – "Audience Award for Most Popular Documentary (Aviva Kempner) tied with Red, White & Yellow (1998)"
2001 Kansas City Film Critics Circle Awards – "Best Documentary"
2000 Las Vegas Film Critics Society Awards – "Sierra Award for Best Documentary"
2000 National Board of Review, USA – "Best Documentary"
2001 National Society of Film Critics Awards, USA – "Best Documentary"
2000 New York Film Critics Circle Awards – "Best Non-Fiction Film"
2001 Peabody Award
1999 Washington Jewish Film Festival – "Audience Award for Documentary (Aviva Kempner)"

Reception 
On Rotten Tomatoes, the film has a "Certified Fresh" award with an aggregate score of 97% based on 63 positive and 2 negative critic reviews.  The website’s consensus reads: "The Life and Times of Hank Greenberg is an affectionate, often very funny portrait of a baseball pioneer."

See also 
Jews and Baseball: An American Love Story, 2010 documentary film

Further reading

Books 
The Baseball Talmud: The Definitive Position-by-Position Ranking of Baseball's Chosen Players, Howard Megdal, Collins, 2009, 
The New Big Book of Jewish Baseball: An Illustrated Encyclopedia & Anecdotal History, Peter S. Horvitz, Joachim Horvitz, Perseus Distribution Services, 2007, 
Jews and Baseball: Entering the American mainstream, 1871-1948, Burton Alan Boxerman, Benita W. Boxerman, McFarland, 2006, 
The Big Book of Jewish Baseball: An Illustrated Encyclopedia & Anecdotal History, Peter S. Horvitz, Joachim Horvitz, SP Books, 2001, 
The Jewish Baseball Hall of Fame: a Who's Who of Baseball Stars, Erwin Lynn, Shapolsky Publishers, 1986, 
Jewish Baseball Stars, Harold Uriel Ribalow, Meir Z. Ribalow, Hippocrene Books, 1984,

Sources 
Peabody Award

Amazon.com editorial review

References

External links 
Official Website
Washington Journal interview with Aviva Kempner, June 30, 2000

1998 films
1998 documentary films
1998 independent films
1990s sports films
American baseball films
American sports documentary films
Detroit Tigers
Documentary films about baseball
Documentary films about sportspeople
Films set in the 1930s
Films set in the 1940s
American independent films
Documentary films about Jews and Judaism in the United States
Jewish-American sports history
Films directed by Aviva Kempner
1990s English-language films
1990s American films